Ethel Kate Westrup (1885–1928) was a British artist, notable as both a painter and ceramicist.

Biography
Westrup was born, and raised, at Hornsey in north London, into a family of at least eight children. No record of a formal art education for Westrup has been identified but it is known that around 1911 she moved, with her artist sister Emily (1870-1960), to Lamorna in Cornwall. Kate Westrup produced oil paintings and drawings, often of animal subjects, and had works shown at the Royal Academy in London, with the New English Art Club and in 1912 exhibited chalk drawings of dogs at the Alpine Club. She contributed illustrations to the 1914 Punch Book of Hunting. Westrup was elected an associate member of the Society of Women Artists in 1923. In the early 1920s, with Ella Naper, Westrup founded the Lamorna Pottery which produced a variety of ceramics and domestic items which were sold through gallery outlets locally and also in Manchester, Liverpool and elsewhere. The Pottery closed after Westrup's death in 1928.

References

1885 births
1928 deaths
20th-century English painters
20th-century English women artists
Animal painters
Artists from London
English potters
English women painters
People from Hornsey
Sibling artists